Brier Creek or Briar Creek is a  tributary of the Savannah River in the U.S. state of Georgia.

The stream's name comes from the Native Americans of the area, who encountered briers along its course.

Crossings 
 Brannens Bridge Crossing
 Jp Crossing
 
 Millhaven Crossing

See also
List of rivers of Georgia
Battle of Brier Creek

References

External links

USGS Hydrologic Unit Map - State of Georgia (1974)

Rivers of Georgia (U.S. state)
Tributaries of the Savannah River
Rivers of Warren County, Georgia
Rivers of Screven County, Georgia